Scythris nigrogrammella is a moth of the family Scythrididae. It was described by Bengt Å. Bengtsson in 2002. It is found in Sudan and Yemen.

References

nigrogrammella
Moths described in 2002